Leonid Veniaminovich Keldysh (7 April 1931 – 11 November 2016) was a Soviet and Russian physicist. Keldysh was a professor in the I.E. Tamm Theory division of the Lebedev Physical Institute of the Russian Academy of Sciences in Moscow and a faculty member at Texas A&M University. He was known for developing the Keldysh formalism, a powerful quantum field theory framework designed to describe a system in a non-equilibrium state, as well as for the theory of excitonic insulators (Keldysh-Kopaev model, with Yuri Kopaev). Keldysh's awards include the 2009 Rusnanoprize, an international nanotechnology award, for his work related to molecular-beam epitaxy, the 2011 Evgenii Feinberg Memorial Medal, and the 2015 Lomonosov Grand Gold Medal of the Russian Academy of Sciences. 

Keldysh was a son of mathematician Lyudmila Keldysh. His uncle, Mstislav Keldysh, was a mathematician and the president of the Academy of Sciences of the Soviet Union. Sergei Novikov, a mathematician and a Fields medalist, is his step-brother.

External links
 Russian Academy of Sciences staff directory
 Keldysh's published papers in the scientific journal Physics-Uspekhi

References

1931 births
2016 deaths
20th-century Russian physicists
21st-century Russian physicists
Scientists from Moscow
Foreign associates of the National Academy of Sciences
Full Members of the Russian Academy of Sciences
Full Members of the USSR Academy of Sciences
Academic staff of the Moscow Institute of Physics and Technology
Lenin Prize winners
Recipients of the Lomonosov Gold Medal
Recipients of the Order "For Merit to the Fatherland", 4th class
Recipients of the Order of the Red Banner of Labour
Experimental physicists
Russian nanotechnologists
Russian physicists
Soviet physicists

Burials at Donskoye Cemetery